Martin Konečný (born 25 December 1972) is a retired Slovak football defender.

References

1972 births
Living people
Slovak footballers
ŠK Slovan Bratislava players
AS Trenčín players
SK Dynamo České Budějovice players
MŠK Žilina players
FC DAC 1904 Dunajská Streda players
Czech First League players
Association football defenders
Slovakia international footballers
Slovak expatriate footballers
Expatriate footballers in the Czech Republic
Slovak expatriate sportspeople in the Czech Republic
Sportspeople from Dunajská Streda